Aiserey is a commune in the Côte-d'Or department in the Bourgogne-Franche-Comté region of eastern France.

The inhabitants of the commune are known as Aiseréens or Aiseréennes

Geography
Aiserey is located some 20 km south-east of Dijon and 32 km north-east of Beaune. It can be accessed by Highway D968 from Dijon and Longecourt-en-Plaine in the north-west continuing through the heart of the commune and the village on to Brazey-en-Plaine in the south-east. There is also the D116 coming from Izeure in the west continuing to Echigey in the east. The railway line running south-east from Dijon passes through the commune and there is a station next to the village. In addition to the village there is the small village of Potangey in the north. The rest of the commune is entirely farmland apart from the former sugar refinery in the east.

The Canal de Bourgogne passes through the commune on the eastern side from north-west to south-east. The Oucherolle stream rises near the village and flows to the north-west. There are reservoirs in the east of the commune linked to the canal.

Neighbouring communes and villages

Heraldry

Administration

List of Successive Mayors of Aiserey

Population

Economy

The Sugar refinery at Aiserey was the only one in Burgundy but it has been closed since December 2007 and been converted into an "organic" flour mill.

Sites and Monuments

A group of Farm Buildings (19th century) are registered as an historical monument.

The two main monuments in Aiserey are its Chateau and its Church, both located in the heart of the village.

Notable people linked to the commune
Étienne Stéphane Tarnier (1828-1897), a famous French physician born in Aiserey, which also has a street named in his honour
Claude Bossuet d'Aiserey the uncle of Jacques-Bénigne Bossuet

See also
Communes of the Côte-d'Or department

References

External links
Aiserey on the old National Geographic Institute website 
Aiserey on Géoportail, National Geographic Institute (IGN) website 
Aiserey on the 1750 Cassini Map

Communes of Côte-d'Or